Bruno Giacosa (died 21 January 2018) was an Italian wine producer from the village Neive in the Langhe region (Piemonte), who produced a number of Barbaresco and Barolo wines, as well as bottlings of Arneis, Barbera, Dolcetto and a sparkling wine. Wines produced from owned vineyards are bottled under the label Azienda Agricola Falletto (di Bruno Giacosa), wines from bought grapes or from grapes from leased vineyards under the label Casa Vinicola Bruno Giacosa. In terms of the production of Nebbiolo, Giacosa was considered a traditionalist. He has been described as the "Genius of Neive".

History
Initially in the tradition of commerciante, Carlo Giacosa and his son Mario Giacosa preceded the third-generation Bruno Giacosa (b. 1929) who began working in the family business from the age of 15, having left school during World War II, and began to learn their craft.

Making wine only from purchased fruit from select vineyards, Giacosa worked to obtain what he deemed the best grapes available from an established network of growers dedicated to producing quality. During the 1960s Giacosa was considered one of the three significant wine producers of Barbaresco, along with Gaja and Produttori del Barbaresco, who demonstrated "the full potential of [Barbaresco]".

In 1964, Bruno Giacosa began bottling single vineyard Barolos and Barbarescos with the cru name on the label. This very first "cru" bottling was a Barbaresco and came from the Santo Stefano vineyard in Neive; it was the very first single vineyard bottling to be labeled as such in all of Piemonte. To this day, Bruno Giacosa cites this wine as his single favorite wine of his entire career! Like many of his contemporaries, for the first two decades of his career, Giacosa was content to buy grapes from farmers in the top vineyards in Barbaresco and Barolo and it was not until 1982 that he bought his first vineyard- the Falletto di Serralunga vineyard in Barolo. In 1996 he was able to also buy parcels in the highly-rated Asili and Rabajá vineyards in Barbaresco, taking ownership of plots of vines in two crus which he believed produced some of the finest fruit that he had sourced over the years. To most commentators, these two vineyards (along perhaps with Martinenga) are considered the finest in the village of Barbaresco.

The Giacosa bottlings of Arneis also attracted attention as during the 1970s as one of only two producers making it along with Vietti, and helped bring the grape back from near extinction.

Over decades Giacosa's reputation for perfectionism became continuously reaffirmed, and the wines "stylistically consistent and painstakingly crafted". Known for his exacting standards, Giacosa will not bottle any wine if the vintage does not meet his scrutinous quality standards, and the vintage will be sold off in bulk as wine that is termed sfuso. Decanter estimates Bruno Giacosa among Italy's First Growths. The winery decided in 2013 that it will not be bottling its top reds from the 2010 vintage.

Since 1990, Giacosa worked with the oenologist Dante Scaglione, who remained with the firm for 16 years. In 2008, the oenologist Giorgio Lavagna was employed as the successor. 
In May 2011, Dante Scaglione communicated his return as oenologist to Giacosa's winery.

Bruno Giacosa suffered a stroke in January 2006 which left him unable to work at the winery though he since made a full recovery. Gradually, Giacosa's daughter Bruna Giacosa, has taken over an increased leadership role of the firm.

In recognition of his achievements, the University of Gastronomic Sciences of Bra in Piedmont gave Bruno Giacosa an honorary degree in 2012.

Production
The Bruno Giacosa estate today encompasses  of vineyards, producing about 400,000 bottles per year. In infrequent vintages that are deemed exceptional, a Riserva is produced which is given a red label.

Vineyards lie in Asili and Rabajà in the Barbaresco zone, in La Morra and Serralunga.  Barbaresco Santo Stefano, which became famous after Bruno began bottling it from the 1964 vintage, was produced from grapes grown by Italo Stupino at Castello di Neive. As of 2012 vintage the wine will be no longer bottled by Bruno Giacosa, as the firm moves towards an estate-only strategy for its top wines.

The oenological philosophy has been described as "updated traditional". Maceration on skins may last up to thirty days, though not past fifty as in extreme traditional practices. Botti (traditional 50hL casks) are used for aging, but in French oak rather than Slavonian.

Azienda Agricola Falletto

The range of wines from vineyards owned by Bruno Giacosa.

Barbaresco DOCG Asili
Barolo DOCG Falletto
Barolo DOCG Le Rocche del Falletto
Barolo DOCG Vigna Croera
Barbera d’Alba DOC Falletto
Dolcetto d’Alba DOC Falletto

Casa Vinicola Bruno Giacosa
The range of wines sourced from the vineyards of growers that are Giacosa's traditional collaborators.

Barbaresco DOCG Santo Stefano di Neive
Nebbiolo d’Alba DOC
Nebbiolo d’Alba DOC Valmaggiore
Dolcetto d’Alba DOC
Dolcetto d’Alba DOC Basarini
Roero Arneis DOCG
Classic Method "Spumante" Extra Brut

References

External links
Bruno Giacosa official site 

20th-century births
2018 deaths
Wineries of Italy
Italian winemakers
People from the Province of Cuneo